Newport coat of arms may apply to
 Coat of arms of Newport, the city of Newport, Wales
 Coat of arms of the town of Newport, Shropshire, England